Imad Ahmad Sayfour (born 1955) is a Kurdish, Iraqi politician. He was born in Khanaqin in 1955 and graduated from Baghdad Technical Institute in 1980. He is a senior member of Iraqi President Jalal Talebani's Patriotic Union of Kurdistan and has served as Minister for Housing and Reconstruction and as Deputy Prime Minister in the Kurdistan Regional Government.

See also
 List of Kurdish people
 Patriotic Union of Kurdistan

References

People from Khanaqin
Iraqi Kurdish people
Iraqi Kurdistani politicians
Living people
Patriotic Union of Kurdistan politicians
1955 births